The 2003 Open de Moselle was a men's tennis tournament played on indoor hard courts at the Arènes de Metz in Metz, France and was part of the International Series of the 2003 ATP Tour. It was the inaugural edition of the tournament and was held from 29 September until 5 October 2003. Fourth-seeded Arnaud Clément won the singles title.

Finals

Singles

 Arnaud Clément defeated  Fernando González 6–3, 1–6, 6–3
 It was Clément's only title of the year and the 4th of his career.

Doubles

 Julien Benneteau /  Nicolas Mahut defeated  Michaël Llodra /  Fabrice Santoro 7–6(7–2), 6–3
 It was Benneteau's only title of the year and the 1st of his career. It was Mahut's only title of the year and the 1st of his career.

References

External links
 Official website
 ATP tournament profile

 
2003 ATP Tour
2003 in French tennis